The Ranavijaya-class landing craft is a landing craft utility developed by the Colombo Dockyard Limited for the Sri Lanka Navy. Two ships of this class have been built and both have been used in several amphibious operations.

Based on this class a Fast Landing Craft was built by Colombo Dockyard for the Maldivian Coast Guard, the smaller craft was 28m in length and has an aluminum hull.

Operators

References

External links
29 M Landing Craft, Colombo Dockyard

Amphibious warfare vessel classes
Ships of the Sri Lanka Navy
Post–Cold War military equipment of Sri Lanka